Michael Farina (born May 5, 1958) is an American wrestler. He competed in the men's Greco-Roman 48 kg at the 1976 Summer Olympics.

References

External links
 

1958 births
Living people
American male sport wrestlers
Olympic wrestlers of the United States
Wrestlers at the 1976 Summer Olympics
People from Elmhurst, Illinois